Dębowa Łąka  is a village in Wąbrzeźno County, Kuyavian-Pomeranian Voivodeship, in north-central Poland. It is the seat of the gmina (administrative district) called Gmina Dębowa Łąka.

The village has a population of 750.

References

Villages in Wąbrzeźno County